The Arthur Holmes Medal and Honorary Membership is one of the most prestigious awards of the European Geosciences Union (EGU). The medal is awarded to scientists who have achieved exceptional international standing in solid Earth sciences for their contributions and scientific achievements. The medal is awarded annually at the General Assembly of the European Geosciences Union since 2005. From 1983 to 2004, the Arthur Holmes Medal was awarded by the European Union of Geosciences (EUG), one of the predecessors of the EGU.

The award is named after Arthur Holmes (1890–1965), a British geologist renown for his contributions in the development of radiometric dating of rocks and minerals and works on mantle convection, which eventually led to the development of the theory of plate tectonics.

Award winners 
Source : (1983–2003) EUG
Source : (2005–present) EUG

See also

 List of geophysics awards

References 

Awards of the European Geosciences Union